Exalla is a genus of flies in the family Lauxaniidae.

Distribution
The species are known from wet montane rainforest habitats in Colombia and Ecuador at elevations above 1500 meters.

Species
Exalla browni Gaimari, 2012
Exalla macalpinei Gaimari, 2012
Exalla shewelli Gaimari, 2012

References

Lauxaniidae
Lauxanioidea genera
Diptera of South America